Tige is a masculine given name and nickname which may refer to:

People:
 Tige Andrews (1920-2007), American actor
 Tige Reynolds (1877–1931), American cartoonist
 Tige Rodgers, co-host of the Tige and Daniel Show American radio program
 Tige Savage (born 1968), American investor and co-founder and managing partner of Revolution LLC, an investment firm
 Tige Simmons (born 1977), Australian wheelchair basketball player
 Tige Stone (1901-1960), American baseball player

Fictional characters:
 Tige, comic strip character Buster Brown's dog

Masculine given names
Lists of people by nickname